Persecution (also released as Sheba, The Terror of Sheba and The Graveyard) is a 1974 British psychological horror film directed by Don Chaffey, produced by Kevin Francis and starring Lana Turner, Ralph Bates, Olga Georges-Picot, Trevor Howard and Suzan Farmer. The film was released in the United States as Sheba and The Terror of Sheba and subsequently re-titled The Graveyard for VHS release in the 1980s.

The film's promotional taglines are:
Warning: this film is NOT for the squeamish
The horror of a twisted mind!
Now it's David's turn to get even… and he has a very special treat for his mother.

Plot summary
Carrie Masters (Lana Turner) is a crippled, wealthy, bitter woman who takes pleasure in tormenting her young son David (Mark Weavers). She blames him for her crippled leg and, in bizarre and horrifying ways, exacts her revenge by dominating him.

Years later, a 24-year-old David (Ralph Bates) returns home with his wife Janie (Suzan Farmer) and their newborn child, but he is still subject to his mother's evil influence. When she is involved in two terrifying deaths, David's mind snaps; although he is already mentally twisted by Carrie's treatment, David becomes completely insane and swears vengeance on his mother for his years of hate and resentment.

Cast
Lana Turner as Carrie Masters
Ralph Bates as David Masters
Trevor Howard as Paul Bellamy
Olga Georges-Picot as Monique Kalfon
Suzan Farmer as Janie Masters
Mark Weavers as Young David
Patrick Allen as Robert Masters
Jennifer Guy as Waitress
Shelagh Fraser as Mrs. Banks
Ronald Howard as Dr. Ross
John Ryan as Gardener
Catherine Brandon as Mrs. Deacon

Production
Persecution was shot in the United Kingdom from late October to November 1973 at Pinewood Studios in London and exterior scenes of the Masters House were shot on location at Denham Place in Buckinghamshire.

Reception
Persecution was a commercial and critical failure and widely panned by critics. In its review of the film, Variety wrote: "The old-fashioned meller is riddled with ho-hum and sometimes laughably trite scripting. Also, very tame in the shock horror department. Under the circumstances, Turner's performance has reasonable poise. There isn't much animation to Ralph Bates as the grown-up edition of the tormented son".
 
Richard Schleib in The Science Fiction, Horror and Fantasy Movie Review wrote: "Turner hams it up and she and Ralph Bates have fun playing games with one another. Don Chaffey’s pace is slow moving, despite occasionally inventive photography and some offbeat editing. The story is confusing – by the end, one is never sure who David’s real father was. The catty premise is not terribly interesting and the script trades in some unconvincingly histrionic psychology. The one show stealer is the sultry seductive Olga Georges-Picot."

Lana Turner herself dismissed the film as a "bomb" and called it one of her worst performances during an interview in 1975.

References

External links

1974 films
1974 horror films
1970s psychological thriller films
British thriller films
British horror films
Films directed by Don Chaffey
Films shot at Pinewood Studios
1970s English-language films
1970s British films